Maurice Davis was a rabbi.

Maurice Davis may also refer to:

Maurice Davis (trumpeter)
Maurice Davis (athlete) in 1986 CARIFTA Games

See also
Maurice Davies (disambiguation)
Morris Davis (disambiguation)